Asya is the name of a Turkish album by Asya. It is also the first studio album by Asya. The album was released in Turkey.

Track listing
 "Vurulmuşum Sana" (I have Fallen in Love with You)  (Lyrics: Aysel Gurel; Music and Arrangements: Onno Tunc)
 "Nafile" (Futile) (Lyrics: Leyla Tuna; Music and Arrangements: Bugra Ugur)
 "Uçtum Seninle" (I Flied With You) (Lyric: Gurel; Music and Arrangements: Sinan Bokesoy)
 "Yoksun Sen" (You have Perished) (Lyrics: Gurel; Music and Arrangements: Bokesoy)
 "Ağlama Gülüm" (Don't Cry My Love) (Lyrics: Asya; Music: Erdinc Senyalar; Arranged by Onno Tunc)
 "Romantik Aşk" (Romantic Love) (Lyrics: Gurel; Music: Georgios Katsaros; Arrangements: Ugur, Bokesoy)
 "Teslim Oldum" (I Gave in) (Lyrics: Nilufer Yumlu; Music: Katsaros; Arrangements: Ugur)
 "Son Gece" (Last Night) (Lyrics: Yumlu; Music: Thanos Mikroutsikos; Arrangements: Ugur)
 "Çığlık Çığlık" (Scream Scream) (Lyrics: Tuna; Music: Ercument Vural)
 "Neyleyim"  (Lyrics: Tuna; Music: Andipas Mazloumidis)

Asya (singer) albums
1994 albums